Stacy was an unincorporated town in Lassen County, California. It was founded as a station on the Fernley and Lassen Railway in expectation of agricultural development of the area; without irrigation, however, the area faded away.

A post office operated at Stacy from 1912 to 1951. The name honored Stacy Spoon, the wife of the postmaster.

References

Former settlements in Lassen County, California
Former populated places in California